Mixtlán  is a town and municipality, in Jalisco in central-western Mexico. It first became a Municipality on October 20, 1938. In its native Náhuatl, Mixtlán means place of clouds.

As of 2005, the municipality had a total population of 3279.

References

http://iglesiacasadelrey.com/index.php?option=com_content&view=article&id=51&Itemid=67

Municipalities of Jalisco